The Medvode Hydroelectric Power Plant (also Medvode HPP) is a run-of-the-river hydroelectricity in Slovenia. The ROR is located on the Sava River in Medvode.

The hydroelectric plant was built in part using forced labor by Catholic priests held as political prisoners after the Second World War. The Medvode Hydroelectric Power Plant is operated by Ljubljana Sava Hydroelectric Plants (SEL).

See also
List of power stations in Slovenia

References

Hydroelectric power stations in Slovenia
Run-of-the-river power stations